Johnnie Andrew Wamsley II (born March 5, 1988) is an American politician who served as a Delegate from the 14th District to the West Virginia House of Delegates from 2020 to 2022. Wamsley is a Republican.

Early life, education, and career
Wamsley was born in Point Pleasant, West Virginia to Vicky and Johnnie Wamsley. He served in the United States Marine Corps from 2007 to 2015 and earned a degree in finance at Marshall University in 2019. He was employed as a credit analyst with various banks after leaving the Marine Corps.

Elections

2020
In his first primary for the 14th District, Wamsley defeated fellow Republican Brian Scott with 51.97% of the vote. There were no incumbents in the race.

In the general election, Wamsley defeated Democrat Chris Yeager with 69.37% of the vote.

Tenure

Committee assignments
Education
Energy and Manufacturing
Small Business and Economic Development
Veterans Affairs and Homeland Security
Workforce Development

Wamsley is an assistant majority whip in the House of Delegates.

Wamsley has a 92% rating from the NRA.

Freedom of speech
Wamsley was a sponsor of House Bill 2595, a bill that would prohibit so-called "divisive concepts" from being taught in West Virginia schools or promoted in other state-funded agencies. It targeted criticisms of American society, eliminating language that would refer to the US as a "fundamentally racist or sexist" country.

Transgender rights
Wamsley supported Senate Bill 341, a bill that would prohibit transgender athletes from competing on the team that aligns with their gender identity.

Worker's rights
Wamsley opposed SB 11, a bill that would make it more difficult for employees to strike.

Personal life
Wamsley is married to Rachel Wamsley and has two children. He is a Catholic.

References

Republican Party members of the West Virginia House of Delegates
Living people
1988 births
21st-century American politicians
People from Point Pleasant, West Virginia
United States Marine Corps officers